Xuanzong (Hsüan-tsung in Wade–Giles) may refer to the following Chinese emperors:

 Emperor Xuanzong of Tang (reigned 713–756)
 Emperor Xuanzong of Tang (9th century) (reigned 846–859)
 Emperor Xuanzong of Jin (reigned 1213–1224)
 Emperor Xuanzong of Ming, or Xuande Emperor (reigned 1425–35) 
 Emperor Xuanzong of Qing, or Daoguang Emperor (reigned 1820–50)

See also
Emperor Xuan (disambiguation)

Temple name disambiguation pages